Nottingham Royal Concert Hall is a concert hall in the English city of Nottingham. It is owned by Nottingham City Council and is part of a complex that also includes the city's Theatre Royal. The Royal Concert Hall's striking modern architecture has proved to be a city landmark at the heart of Nottingham City Centre, opposite the more recently built The Cornerhouse complex.

The concert hall is served by the adjacent Royal Centre tram stop on the Nottingham Express Transit.

History
The site of the Royal Concert Hall was previously the old 'Empire Palace of Varieties' designed and built in 1898 by Frank Matcham. The Empire closed for the last time in 1958 and was demolished for road-widening in 1969.

Designed by the Renton Howard Wood Levin Partnership (architects of the Sheffield Crucible Theatre), the hall cost £12 million to complete.  The project's client was Nottingham City Council.

Work on the Royal Concert Hall began in 1980 and was completed in 1982, providing Nottingham with a contemporary 2,499-seater auditorium. The first artist to perform there was Elton John in November 1982.

See also
List of concert halls

References

External links
Official website
Exterior photograph
Interior photograph
See the Royal Concert Hall on Google Street View

Buildings and structures in Nottingham
Music venues in Nottinghamshire
Concert halls in England
Tourist attractions in Nottingham